Leif Robert Kronberg (born August 15, 1976 in Göteborg, Västra Götaland) is a Swedish male hurdler of Serbian descent.

He finished 8th in the 110m hurdles final at the 2000 Olympics. He competed again in the 2004 Olympics, reaching the semi-finals. He has also been a regular competitor in the World Championships in Athletics, being present at every event since 1997. His best position has been a 5th place in the 2003 World Championships held in Edmonton.

He finished 7th in the final of the 110m hurdles at the 2002 European Athletics Championships in Munich and 5th in the final of the same event in the 2006 European Athletics Championships in Gothenburg.

Kronberg is also a Swedish national champion in inline hockey while playing for the Gothenburg Jokers.

Competition record

References

External links

1976 births
Living people
Swedish people of Serbian descent
Swedish male hurdlers
Athletes (track and field) at the 2000 Summer Olympics
Athletes (track and field) at the 2004 Summer Olympics
Olympic athletes of Sweden
Universiade medalists in athletics (track and field)
Universiade bronze medalists for Sweden
Athletes from Gothenburg
Medalists at the 2001 Summer Universiade